Dellon Torres (born 14 June 1994) is a Belizean footballer who currently plays for Altitude in the Premier League of Belize and the Belize national team.

International career 
Torres made his national team debut for Belize on 22 January 2013 in a 2–1 defeat against Nicaragua.

References

External links
 

1994 births
Living people
Belizean footballers
Belize international footballers
Premier League of Belize players
Association football midfielders
Altitude FC (Belize) players
People from Stann Creek District